The 2004 Ontario Men's Curling Championship was held February 2-8 at the Harry Lumley Bayshore Community Centre in Owen Sound.  

1998 Olympic silver medalist Mike Harris and his team of John Base, Phil Loevenmark and Trevor Wall would go on to win his lone provincial championship of his career. They would go on to represent Ontario at the 2004 Nokia Brier in Saskatoon. 

This would mark the final provincial championship for 2-time World champion and 56-year-old Ed Werenich who had come out of retirement for the season.

Teams

Standings

Tie-breaker
Corner 6-4 Ziola

Playoffs

References
Ontario Curling Association - Internet Archive
CurlingZone event page

Ontario Tankard
2004 in Canadian curling
Sport in Owen Sound
Curling in Ontario
2004 in Ontario